A Woman of No Importance is a 1921 British drama film directed by Denison Clift and starring Fay Compton, Milton Rosmer, Ward McAllister, Lillian Walker, and Henry Vibart. It is based on the play A Woman of No Importance by Oscar Wilde. It is not known whether the film currently survives, and it may be a lost film.

Cast
Fay Compton as Rachel Arbuthnot
Milton Rosmer as Lord Illingworth
Ward McAllister as Gerald Arbuthnot
Lillian Walker as Hester Hasley
Henry Vibart as Farquhar
Gwen Carton as Elsie Farquhar
M. Gray Murray as	Sir Thomas Harford
Hetta Bartlett as	Lady Cecilia
Daisy Campbell as	Lady Hunstanton
Julie Hartley-Milburn as Lady Rofford
Joey Sanderson as Nurse

References

External links
 
 

1921 films
1921 drama films
British silent feature films
British films based on plays
Films based on works by Oscar Wilde
Ideal Film Company films
Films directed by Denison Clift
British drama films
British black-and-white films
1920s English-language films
1920s British films
Silent drama films